The 1932 Dulwich by-election was a by-election held on 8 June 1932 for the British House of Commons constituency of Dulwich in South London.

Vacancy
The by-election was triggered by the death of the serving Conservative Party Member of Parliament (MP), Sir Frederick Hall.

Electoral history
The former Conservative member had a large majority and the seat was considered a safe seat for the party. The result of the last election was;

Candidates

The Conservative and National candidate was 48-year-old Bracewell Smith, a member of Holborn Borough Council from 1922, serving as Mayor 1931–32, and he served on the London County Council from 1925 to 1928. Smith made his fortune in property. In particular he was a major hotel investor/owner and who built the Park Lane Hotel in 1920.
The Labour candidate was 40-year-old Helen Bentwich, a trade unionist. She was a niece of the Home Secretary, Sir Herbert Samuel, and had recently returned from Palestine where her husband, Norman Bentwich, had been Attorney-General. 
The Liberal candidate was 49-year-old Dr Charles Cooke-Taylor, a psychiatrist. In 1910 Cooke-Taylor contested Holborn as a candidate of the Liberal Party. Between 1918 and 1931 he contested the Dulwich seat six times, though he never won.

Campaign
The major issues were the stringent financial policies of the National Government, and for the Liberal candidate, opposition to protectionism.

Result 
The result was much as expected, with turnout around two-thirds of what it had been in the previous year's general election. The Conservative candidate's majority was slashed in half, but the Liberal candidate slightly increased his vote, pushing Labour into third place.

Aftermath

See also 
 List of United Kingdom by-elections
 Dulwich constituency

References 
 The Times, 9 June 1932

Specific

Dulwich,1932
Dulwich by-election
Dulwich by-election
Dulwich,1932
By-election, 1932